General John Nicholas Reynolds Houghton, Baron Houghton of Richmond,  (born 18 October 1954) is a retired senior British Army officer and former Chief of the Defence Staff (CDS) of the British Armed Forces. He was appointed CDS in July 2013, following the retirement of General Sir David Richards. He served as Commanding Officer of the 1st Battalion, the Green Howards in Northern Ireland during The Troubles and later became Commander of the 39th Infantry Brigade in Northern Ireland. He deployed as Senior British Military Representative and Deputy Commanding General, Multi-National Force – Iraq during the Iraq War. Later, he became Chief of Joint Operations at Permanent Joint Headquarters and served as Vice-Chief of the Defence Staff until assuming the position of CDS. Houghton retired from the British Army in July 2016, and was succeeded as CDS by Air Chief Marshal Sir Stuart Peach.

Early life
Houghton was born on 18 October 1954 in Otley near Leeds and is the son of Frank and Margaret Houghton. He was educated at Woodhouse Grove School, a private school near Bradford. In 1977, he graduated from St Peter's College, Oxford, having taken an in-Service Bachelor of Arts degree in Modern History.

Military career
After attending Royal Military Academy Sandhurst, Houghton was commissioned into the Green Howards as a second lieutenant on 9 March 1974. He was promoted to lieutenant on 9 March 1976, to captain on 9 September 1980 and to major on 30 September 1986. He was appointed Military Assistant to the Chief of Staff British Army of the Rhine and subsequently became a member of the Directing Staff at the Royal Military College of Science, Shrivenham. Promoted to lieutenant colonel on 30 June 1991, he became Commanding Officer of 1st Battalion The Green Howards in 1991 and was deployed to Northern Ireland in 1993.

Houghton was made Deputy Assistant Chief of Staff at HQ Land Command in 1994 and he attended the Higher Command and Staff Course in 1997. Promoted to brigadier on 31 December 1997 with seniority from 30 June 1997, he became Commander of 39 Infantry Brigade in Northern Ireland in 1997 and was Director of Military Operations at the Ministry of Defence from December 1999 to July 2002. He was promoted to major general on 26 July 2002 and was made Chief of Staff of the Allied Rapid Reaction Corps that year before becoming Assistant Chief of the Defence Staff (Operations) in 2004.

Promoted to lieutenant general on 14 October 2005, Houghton was deployed as Senior British Military Representative and Deputy Commanding General, Multi-National Force – Iraq in October 2005. He became Chief of Joint Operations at Permanent Joint Headquarters (UK) in 2006 and, after being relieved of that post on 13 March 2009, he was promoted to general and appointed Vice-Chief of the Defence Staff on 5 May 2009.

Houghton took over as Chief of the Defence Staff on 18 July 2013. He stated that one of his key objectives was to re-shape the Armed forces in the post-Afghanistan era. Houghton also raised concerns about the Armed Forces' abilities with the personnel and budget cuts. As of 2015, Houghton was paid a salary of between £255,000 and £259,999 by the department, making him one of the 328 most highly paid people in the British public sector at that time.

In January 2016, the government announced that Houghton would be replaced by Sir Stuart Peach as Chief of the Defence Staff in the summer of 2016. Houghton handed over to Peach on 14 July 2016.

Retirement

In 2016, he was appointed Constable of The Tower of London, as the monarch's representative for five years, replacing Richard Dannatt, Baron Dannatt. This is primarily a ceremonial post but the Constable is also a trustee of Historic Royal Palaces and the Royal Armouries. He left his role in 2022 with Sir Gordon Messenger replacing him.

On 20 November 2017, Houghton joined the House of Lords as a crossbencher.

Honours and decorations
On 12 October 1993, Houghton was appointed Officer of the Order of the British Empire (OBE) "in recognition of distinguished service in Northern Ireland". He was appointed Commander of the Order of the British Empire (CBE) on 14 April 2000 "in recognition of gallant and distinguished services in Northern Ireland during the period 1 April 1999 to 30 September 1999". In 2006, he was made an Officer of the Legion of Merit "in recognition of gallant and distinguished services during coalition operations in Iraq. He was appointed Knight Commander of the Order of the Bath (KCB) in the 2008 Birthday Honours and Knight Grand Cross of the Order of the Bath (GCB) in the 2011 Birthday Honours.

Houghton was Colonel of the Regiment of 158 (Royal Anglian) Transport Regiment (Volunteers) from 1 November 2003 to 1 September 2008 and honorary Colonel Commandant of the King's Division from 10 December 2005 to 10 December 2008 as well as Colonel of the Regiment of The Yorkshire Regiment from 6 June 2006 to 6 June 2011. He was appointed Colonel Commandant of the Intelligence Corps on 19 July 2008 and Aide-de-Camp General (ADC Gen) to The Queen on 1 October 2009.

In June 2015, Houghton also received an honorary Panglima Gagah Angkatan Tentera (PGAT) award from the Deputy Minister for Defence of Malaysia.

In October 2017, it was announced that a life peerage would be conferred on Houghton. On 20 November of the same year, he was created Baron Houghton of Richmond, of Richmond in the County of North Yorkshire.

Personal life
In 1982 Houghton married Margaret Glover: they have one son, the comedian Tom Houghton (born 1984), and one daughter. His interests include golf, sailing, shooting, cooking and history.

Arms

References

|-

|-

|-
 

|-

|-

1954 births
British military personnel of The Troubles (Northern Ireland)
Alumni of St Peter's College, Oxford
British Army generals
British Army personnel of the Iraq War
Commanders of the Order of the British Empire
Crossbench life peers
Life peers created by Elizabeth II
Deputy Lieutenants of Greater London
Graduates of the Royal Military Academy Sandhurst
Green Howards officers
Knights Grand Cross of the Order of the Bath
Living people
People educated at Woodhouse Grove School
People from Otley
Foreign recipients of the Legion of Merit
Constables of the Tower of London
Chiefs of the Defence Staff (United Kingdom)
Officers of the Legion of Merit
Military personnel from Yorkshire